The Western Springs Water Tower is a museum and former water tower in Western Springs, Illinois. Construction on the tower began in 1892 and finished in 1893. Civil engineers Benezette Williams, Edgar Williams, and Ethan Philbrick designed the tower. In addition to holding water, the tower originally held the Western Springs police department, jail, and municipal offices. The village services all left the tower in 1968, and the Western Springs Historical Society opened a village museum in the tower two years later. In 1991, a lightning strike set the tower on fire, destroying the water tank; the museum reopened in 1993 after extensive rehabilitation efforts. The water tower is considered a symbol of Western Springs by residents, and multiple businesses and local organizations have taken their names from the tower.

The water tower was added to the National Register of Historic Places on June 4, 1981.

References

Infrastructure completed in 1892
Buildings and structures on the National Register of Historic Places in Cook County, Illinois
Western Springs, Illinois
Water towers in Illinois
Water towers on the National Register of Historic Places in Illinois